Benzoyl chloride, also known as benzenecarbonyl chloride, is an organochlorine compound with the formula . It is a colourless, fuming liquid with an irritating odour, and consists of a benzene ring with an acyl chloride substituent. It is mainly useful for the production of peroxides but is generally useful in other areas such as in the preparation of dyes, perfumes, pharmaceuticals, and resins.

Preparation
Benzoyl chloride is produced from benzotrichloride using either water or benzoic acid:
C6H5CCl3  +  H2O -> C6H5COCl  +  2 HCl
C6H5CCl3  +  C6H5CO2H -> 2 C6H5COCl  +  HCl
As with other acyl chlorides, it can be generated from the parent acid and standard chlorinating agents such as phosphorus pentachloride, thionyl chloride, and oxalyl chloride. It was first prepared by treatment of benzaldehyde with chlorine.

An early method for production of benzoyl chloride involved chlorination of benzyl alcohol.

Reactions
It reacts with water to produce hydrochloric acid and benzoic acid:
C6H5COCl  +  H2O  ->  C6H5COOH  +  HCl

Benzoyl chloride is a typical acyl chloride. It reacts with alcohols to give the corresponding esters. Similarly, it reacts with amines to give the amide.

It undergoes the Friedel-Crafts acylation with aromatic compounds to give the corresponding benzophenones and related derivatives.  With carbanions, it serves again as a source of the benzoyl cation synthon, .

Benzoyl peroxide, a common reagent in polymer chemistry, is produced industrially by treating benzoyl chloride with hydrogen peroxide and sodium hydroxide:
2 C6H5COCl  +  H2O2  +  2 NaOH  ->  (C6H5CO)2O2  +  2 NaCl  +  2 H2O

References

External links 
 International Chemical Safety Card 1015

Acyl chlorides
Benzene derivatives
IARC Group 2A carcinogens